Richard Heath (born August 9, 1955) is a U.S. politician and a Republican member of the Kentucky House of Representatives representing District 2 since January 8, 2013.

Education
Heath earned his BS in agricultural education and his MA in agriculture from Murray State University.

Elections
2012 When District 2 Democratic Representative Fred Nesler retired and left the seat open, Heath won the May 22, 2012 Republican Primary with 752 votes (78.6%) and won the November 6, 2012 General election with 9,681 votes (54.8%) against Democratic nominee Kelly Whitaker.

References

External links
Official page at the Kentucky General Assembly

Richard Heath at Ballotpedia
Richard Heath at OpenSecrets

Place of birth missing (living people)
1955 births
Living people
Republican Party members of the Kentucky House of Representatives
Murray State University alumni
People from Mayfield, Kentucky
21st-century American politicians